The Arch 1979–1980 (LH 503c) is a large stone sculpture by Henry Moore located in Kensington Gardens, London. It was given to the park by Moore in 1980.

Comment of the artist
In a 1980 interview Moore said that "After the 1978 exhibition at the Serpentine Gallery in London, in which several large pieces were located in Kensington Gardens, there was a request for me to leave a sculpture there permanently, which I agreed to do. 
I thought the Large Arch was very naturally sited, particularly as it could be seen reflected in the water from across the lake. 
During the exhibition, many people believed the sculpture to be made of marble, but in fact it was a fibreglass exhibition cast made originally for my exhibition at the Forte di Belvedere in Florence (1963), because of the difficulty of getting a very heavy bronze or marble on to the site. Therefore, so that it could be left as a permanent sculpture in Kensington Gardens, I produced a version in travertine marble which is a very lasting material."

Restoration
The Arch was found to be unstable in 1996, and was subsequently dismantled and placed into storage. It was restored and replaced in its original location in 2012.

See also
List of sculptures by Henry Moore

References

1980 in London
1980 sculptures
Limestone sculptures in the United Kingdom
Outdoor sculptures in London
Sculptures by Henry Moore
Tourist attractions in the City of Westminster
Tourist attractions in the Royal Borough of Kensington and Chelsea
Kensington Gardens